Cevallos is a location in Ecuador

Cevallos may also refer to:

Cevallos (surname)